Never So Few is a 1959 CinemaScope Metrocolor war film, directed by John Sturges and starring Frank Sinatra, Gina Lollobrigida, Peter Lawford, Steve McQueen, Richard Johnson, Paul Henreid, Brian Donlevy, Dean Jones, Charles Bronson, and Philip Ahn, and featuring uncredited roles by renowned Asian actors Mako, George Takei and James Hong. The script was loosely based on an actual OSS Detachment 101 incident recorded in a 1957 novel by Tom T. Chamales. Sinatra's character of Captain Tom Reynolds is based on a real OSS officer and, later, sheriff of Sangamon County, Illinois, U.S. Navy Lt. Meredith Rhule.

Plot
Burma, 1943. A unit of American and British forces under the OSS joins with native Kachin to hold back Japanese invaders, while facing problems with limited supplies and lack of medical care. The unit's leaders, Captains Tom Reynolds and Danny De Mortimer, fly to Calcutta to rectify both problems. While there, they are assured they can select any army doctor for transfer to their unit. Tom and Danny are then ordered on a 2-week leave. They travel to the resort of Cawaga, where Tom falls in love with Carla, mistress to a mysterious businessman of doubtful reputation. Tom and Danny also encounter a doctor, Captain Travis. Much to his objections, they tag Travis for transfer to their unit in the Burmese hills, along with a tough, resourceful "kid" corporal named Ringa.

Upon returning to their unit with Travis and Ringa, Tom and Danny authorize a big Christmas bash with lots of drinking. The proceedings, however, are interrupted by a surprise Japanese raid. It is a costly affair. Some in the unit are killed, and many, including Tom, are wounded. Cpl. Ringa interrogates a captured Japanese soldier, who reveals a traitor in Tom's unit. After the informer is executed, Tom and other wounded are transported to a Calcutta hospital for recovery. Upon their return, Tom's unit launches an assault on a strategic Japanese-held airstrip. The mission succeeds but results in many lives lost. While on their way back to base, the unit comes across a destroyed American convoy and finds evidence indicating renegade Chinese were responsible. Tom orders a pursuit of the renegades. They find the Chinese camp, locate their supply tent, and come upon several dozen American dog tags and personal effects. Shocked and outraged, Tom realizes the renegades have been killing American soldiers.

But when he radios OSS headquarters, he gets a reply ordering his immediate return to base as the Chungking government has lodged a complaint. While Tom consults with his officers, a Chinese soldier kills Danny. Tom angrily sends a message to OSS rebuffing their demand. He then orders Ringa to execute the prisoners. When he returns to headquarters in Calcutta, Tom, who is placed under house arrest, encounters an angry, vindictive officer from Washington, General Sloan, who tells Tom he is there specifically to see him hang. Tom answers back by showing the general a crate of the American dog tags found at the renegade camp. Sloan quietly admits to being sickened by the sight. Hours later, when an arrogant Chinese representative, Gen. Chao, struts on the scene and demands an official apology, Sloan tells Chao to "go to hell." Exonerated, Tom is freed and reunites with Carla before returning to the Kachin and the war.

Cast

Release

Steve McQueen

Rat Pack cohort Sammy Davis, Jr. was originally slated to play McQueen's role, but Sinatra yanked it away after Davis mildly criticized Sinatra during a radio interview. McQueen was mainly noted at the time for the television series Wanted: Dead or Alive and the horror movie The Blob. Never So Few marked his introduction to working with director John Sturges, who went on to cast McQueen in his breakout role the following year, as second lead in The Magnificent Seven, and later as the motorcycle-jumping lead in the classic The Great Escape.

On the original US one-sheet theatrical poster (see infobox above), only Sinatra and Lollobrigida were top billed. As illustrated to the right, in the 1967 re-release McQueen's credit was moved above the title, and he was featured prominently in the artwork.

In a similar move, Sinatra later recast the role of Rat Pack colleague Peter Lawford after Lawford failed to deliver his brother-in-law President John F. Kennedy for a stay at Sinatra's house, giving Lawford's part in Robin and the 7 Hoods to Bing Crosby, Kennedy's choice as host for his visit. Sinatra never spoke to Lawford again.

Reception

Box office
According to MGM records the film was popular, earning $3,020,000 in the US and Canada and $2,250,000 elsewhere, but because of its high cost resulted in a loss of $1,155,000.

Critical response
Opening to middling reviews, Never So Few was praised for its action sequences, but criticized for a romantic sub-plot that bogged the film down. Newcomer McQueen garnered the bulk of the film's good notice. Variety commented that "Steve McQueen has a good part, and he delivers with impressive style."

References

External links
 
 
 
 
 Variety Review

1959 films
1959 war films
Films directed by John Sturges
Films set in 1943
War romance films
Office of Strategic Services in fiction
Metro-Goldwyn-Mayer films
Films scored by Hugo Friedhofer
Films set in Myanmar
Films shot in Sri Lanka
Burma Campaign films
1950s English-language films
American World War II films
American romance films
1950s American films